Blake Wotherspoon (born 20 February 1997) is an Australian field hockey player. He was a former member of the Australia men's national under-21 field hockey team.

He is the younger brother of Australian International Dylan Wotherspoon.

References

Living people
1997 births
Australian male field hockey players
People from New South Wales
HC Klein Zwitserland players
Men's Hoofdklasse Hockey players
Male field hockey defenders
Expatriate field hockey players
Australian expatriate sportspeople in the Netherlands